Patoc is a strongly fumarolic stratovolcano in the Philippines. Patoc is located in Mountain Province, part of the Cordillera Central range, on the island of Luzon, in the Philippines. It is located 6 cadastral kilometres north of Bontoc, at latitude 17.147°N (17°8'48"N), longitude 120.98°E (120°58'48"E).

Physical features

A stream and village on the west side are named Mainit (a Tagalog word for "hot"). There are hot springs at the village of Mainit, one of which has been successfully commercialised for tourists.

Eruptions
There are no reports of eruptions.

Geology

Rock type is predominantly andesite.

Listings

The Smithsonian Institution's Global Volcanism Program lists Patoc as strongly fumarolic. The Philippine Institute of Volcanology and Seismology (PHIVOLCS) has not listed Patoc or any volcanic related activity at this location.

See also
 List of active volcanoes in the Philippines
 List of potentially active volcanoes in the Philippines
 List of inactive volcanoes in the Philippines
 Philippine Institute of Volcanology and Seismology
 Pacific ring of fire

References

External links
 Philippine Institute of Volcanology and Seismology (PHIVOLCS) List of Volcanoes

Stratovolcanoes of the Philippines
Subduction volcanoes
Volcanoes of Luzon
Mountains of the Philippines
Landforms of Mountain Province